Redner's Markets, Inc. is a privately held, American supermarket chain headquartered in Reading, Pennsylvania. Redner's is an employee-owned company that is wholly owned by present and past employees and members of the Redner family. In 2012, 48% was owned by Redner's employees and 52% by the Redner family. Redner's operates stores throughout Pennsylvania, Delaware,  and Maryland. The chain has a distribution warehouse located in Maidencreek Township, Pennsylvania.

History
Redner's Markets was founded in March 1970, by Mary and Earl Redner. They opened two supermarkets in Reading, PA.

In 1975, the company formed an Employee Stock Ownership Plan (ESOP), making them the first supermarket in Pennsylvania to be employee owned.

In March 1987 the company opened its first Warehouse Market location. All its supermarkets were converted to the warehouse style by November 1987.

In October 1990, Earl Redner retired and Richard and Gary W. Redner took over management of the company. Mary Redner passed away in 2007.  Earl Redner passed away in 2017.  The company is currently managed by Richard along with third generation Ryan Redner and Gary M. Redner.

In 2020, Redner's Warehouse Markets celebrated their 50th anniversary.

Divisions
Redner's operations are organized into three divisions: Redner's Warehouse Market, Redner's Fresh Market and Redner's Quick Shoppe. The total number of Redner's locations is 64.

Redner's Warehouse Market 

Redner's Warehouse Markets, also known as Redner's, are warehouse-style markets without the need of a store club membership fee. These stores stock general merchandise and a full-service supermarket, selling products such as meat and poultry, baked goods, delicatessen, frozen foods, dairy products, garden produce, and fresh seafood. As of May 20, 2021, there were 42 Redner's Warehouse Market locations in Pennsylvania, Delaware, and Maryland.

Redner's Fresh Market 

Redner's Fresh Markets are more conventional supermarkets  and are slightly smaller than the size of a Redner's Warehouse Market. These stores offer beer & wine café, full-service food and grocery, and beauty aids/non-foods. As of May 20, 2021, there were 3 Redner's Fresh Markets. The first location opened in the fall of 2019 in Reading, with two more locations (one in Aubdon and one in Bel Air, Maryland) opening soon after. There were originally expansion plans to bring the Redner's Fresh Market store concept to a larger amount of existing stores, but these plans were scrapped due to the cost of store upgrades and national labor shortages.

Redner's Quick Shoppe 

Redner's Quick Shoppe is a combined gas station and convenience store. Some Redner's Quick Shoppe locations offer Automatic Car Washes and Diesel. As of May 20, 2021, there were 20 Redner's Quick Shoppes.

References

External links
 Redner's official website
 Store locations

American companies established in 1970
Retail companies established in 1970
Privately held companies based in Pennsylvania
Supermarkets of the United States
Companies based in Berks County, Pennsylvania
1970 establishments in Pennsylvania